Contact potential may refer to:

 Contact potential, a voltage generated; See Electromotive force
 Galvani potential, at a junction of two metals
 Volta potential, between two points in vacuum near surfaces of two metals in contact
 Contact electrification, an erroneous scientific theory from the Enlightenment